Schizolaena microphylla is a tree in the family Sarcolaenaceae. It is endemic to Madagascar. The specific epithet  is from the Latin meaning "small leaves".

Description
Its leaves are elliptic to ovate or roundish in shape and are hairy on the underside.

Distribution and habitat
Schizolaena microphylla is known only from the central regions of Vakinankaratra and Amoron'i Mania. Its habitat is subhumid forests from  altitude. Some subpopulations of the trees are within protected areas.

References

microphylla
Endemic flora of Madagascar
Trees of Madagascar
Plants described in 1925
Taxa named by Joseph Marie Henry Alfred Perrier de la Bâthie